Ewelina Szybiak (born 13 September 1989) is a Polish racing cyclist. She rode at the 2014 UCI Road World Championships.

References

External links

1989 births
Living people
Polish female cyclists
Place of birth missing (living people)
21st-century Polish women